The Ronde van West-Vlaanderen was a cycling race organized for the last time in 1978. 

The course was situated in West-Flanders. The competition's roll of honor includes the successes of Eddy Merckx and Eric De Vlaeminck.

Winners

References 

Cycle races in Belgium
1960 establishments in Belgium
Defunct cycling races in Belgium
Recurring sporting events established in 1960
Recurring sporting events disestablished in 1978
1978 disestablishments in Belgium